This is a list of seasons completed by the NC State Wolfpack men's basketball team. The Wolfpack won the NCAA championship in 1974 and 1983. The team competed in the Southern Conference until becoming a charter member of the Atlantic Coast Conference in 1953. NC State has won the ACC men's basketball tournament ten times, which is the third most of any school in the conference.

Season-by-season results

  Everett Case coached the first two games of the 1964–65 season and had a record of 1–1 (0–1 in the ACC) during those two games.
  The 1972–73 was forced to skip postseason play due to an NCAA recruiting infraction. Assistant coach Eddie Biedenbach had played in a pick-up basketball game with David Thompson on a recruiting visit to Raleigh, North Carolina. The Wolfpack finished the season undefeated at 27–0 but forfeited the opportunity to compete for the national championship.

References

NC State Wolfpack
NC State Wolfpack basketball seasons